Beaver City is an unincorporated community in Washington Township, Newton County, in the U.S. state of Indiana.

History
Beaver City was founded in 1893, and was named after the local Beaver Prairie. A post office was established at Beaver City in 1866, and remained in operation until it was discontinued in 1913.

Geography

References

Unincorporated communities in Newton County, Indiana
Unincorporated communities in Indiana